Mougon-Thorigné was a short-lived commune in the department of Deux-Sèvres in western France. The commune was established on 1 January 2017 by merger of the former communes of Mougon and Thorigné. On 1 January 2019, it was merged into the new commune Aigondigné.

See also 
Communes of the Deux-Sèvres department

References 

Former communes of Deux-Sèvres
Populated places established in 2017
2017 establishments in France